Andrew Black (born 1974) is a Scottish film director.

Black's film The Snell Show won Best Short at the 2003 Slamdance Film Festival.  His first feature film was Pride and Prejudice: A Latter-day Comedy.  In 2007 his film Moving McAllister was released.  Black has also been involved in TV productions and as a writer for video games.

Black was born in Edinburgh, Scotland.  He studied at Edinburgh College of Art and Brigham Young University.

Sources

Deseret News, 30 July 2004 article on Pride and Prejudice: A Latter-day Comedy
Meridian Magazine article on Black

1974 births
Alumni of the Edinburgh College of Art
Brigham Young University alumni
Living people
Scottish film directors
Scottish emigrants to the United States